Nanhua or Nan Hua may refer to:

Places
Nanhua County, in Yunnan, China
Nanhua, Tainan, rural district in Tainan, Taiwan
Nanhua Dam, dam across the Houku River in southern Taiwan

Institutions
Nanhua University, in Chiayi County, Taiwan
Nan Hua Primary School, in Singapore
Nan Hua High School, in Singapore
Nanhua Temple, Buddhist monastery in Shaoguan, China 
Nan Hua Temple, Buddhist temple and seminary in Africa